Joseph Benjamin Davol (August 25, 1864 – June 15, 1923) was an American marine painter and art teacher.
 
He was born in Chicago. Following art studies in Boston and New York, Davol studied in Paris at the Académie Julian in 1895–96. In Paris he studies with Henri Laurens, Benjamin, and Constant.

He was a student of  Charles Herbert Woodbury, and lived in Ogunquit, Maine during his active years a professional painter until his death.  Commissioned the building of a studio from the noted architect John Calvin Stevens.

He died in Ogunquit and his obituary appeared in the New York Times Sunday June 17, 1923.



Exhibitions and Honors 
Member of the Salmagundi Club (salmagundi.org)
 Exhibited extensively at:
 Corcoran Gallery
 Pennsylvania Academy of the Fine Arts (the oldest art museum and school in the nation)
 Boston Art Club: Official link
 Exhibition about the Boston Art Club.
 Silver medal winner at the 1915 Panama-Pacific International Exposition (1915)  in San Francisco

Collections  
 Portland Museum of Art, Portland, ME portlandmuseum.org
 Farnsworth Museum of Art, Rockland ME  farnsworthmuseum.org

Bibliography  
Chadbourne, Janice H. and Karl Gabosh and Charles O. Vogel, ed.  The Boston Art Club Exhibition Record, 1873–1909.  Madison, Connecticut: Sound View Press, 1991. 
Available through the Boston Art Club.

Images 
Davol Beach at Ogunquit, ca. 1915

Davol Painting In Farnsworth Collection

19th-century American painters
American male painters
20th-century American painters
1864 births
1923 deaths
People from Ogunquit, Maine
19th-century American male artists
20th-century American male artists